Leksands Idrottsförening is a Swedish ice hockey team from the town of Leksand in the region of Dalarna. The team plays in the top-tier league, SHL, after succeeding through the 2019 SHL qualifiers and thus earning promotion to the SHL. The club's home arena is Tegera Arena, which seats 7,650 spectators.

History 

The club was formed on 13 August 1919, originally playing bandy and ski competitions. In 1920 they also took up football.

The first hockey game was played in 1938, when they beat Mora IK 11–0, and this sport is now the only sport the club competes in. Despite the fact that the town of Leksand only has 6,000 inhabitants, Leksands IF is one of the most popular teams in Sweden, and the team averages over 4,000 spectators per game in their home arena despite playing in the second tier. Leksand played in the top hockey division in Sweden from 1951 until 2001. The club was very successful between 1969 and 1975, when they became Swedish champions four times (1969, 1973–1975). Before the current top division, Elitserien (now known as the SHL), was formed prior to the 1975–76 season, they had been the runners-up four times: 1959, 1964, 1971 and 1972. Leksand has never become SHL champions despite winning the SHL's regular season in 1980, 1994 and 1997, and being the runners-up in 1989. In 2001, they were the club with the second most consecutive seasons in the highest division at that point (the record is held by Södertälje SK, with 53 consecutive seasons between 1925 and 1978).

Following the relegation to HockeyAllsvenskan in April 2001, Leksand commuted between the top and second divisions until 2005–06, when the team was relegated to the second tier again, where they would find themselves until the 2012–13 season.

For the 2007–08 season, Leksand signed former NHL goaltender Ed Belfour in an attempt to regain top league status. After winning the second league with relative ease, the team failed in the final qualification stage, Kvalserien, to gain promotion. Ed Belfour retired after the 2007–08 season.

Leksand once again won Allsvenskan in the 2008–09 season, but once again failed to qualify for the Elitserien in the 2009 Kvalserien. The managers Thomas Kempe and Thomas Jonsson were sacked following three straight defeats in the beginning of the Kvalserien. The team finished the 2009 Kvalserien with five wins in the last six games, but still failed to qualify. For the 2009–10 season, Leksand employed Leif Strömberg, who had previously successfully guided Södertälje SK through Kvalserien. The team once again won Allsvenskan and qualified for the 2010 Kvalserien, finishing three points ahead of AIK. In the ninth round of the 2010 Kvalserien, Leksand had a good chance to put them in the driver's seat for promotion to Elitserien, but Leksand failed to beat the Kvalserien's worst ranked team Växjö Lakers and, despite a win in the tenth and final round, Leksand missed Elitserien as both AIK and Rögle BK won their respective games in the final round.

After failing promotion, Leif Strömberg was replaced by ex-Leksand forward Niklas Eriksson, under whom the following season Leksand attempted to reach the Kvalserien for the seventh consecutive season. The team finished fourth in Allsvenskan and missed automatic qualification for the Kvalserien and had to play in a pre-qualification series to reach the Kvalserien, but Leksand finished third and missed the Kvalserien. Before the 2011/12 season, assistant head coach Christer Olsson took over the reins, but was sacked following a defeat at Sundsvall Hockey in late November and replaced by Andreas Appelgren.

After winning the regular season in the 2012–13 season, Leksand once again qualified for play in Kvalserien. In the 2013 Kvalserien, Leksand finally promoted back to the Swedish Hockey League (SHL; formerly Elitserien), the top-tier league, for the first time since the 2005–06 season.

Season-by-season record
This is a partial list, featuring the five most recent completed seasons. For a more complete list, see List of Leksands IF seasons.

Players and personnel

Current roster

Source: leksandsif.se and eliteprospects.comAs of 16 February, 2023

Retired numbers 
2 Åke Lassas
18 Jonas Bergqvist

Honored numbers 
1 Christer Abris
2 Tomas Jonsson
3 Vilgot Larsson
6 Thommy Abrahamsson 
8 Magnus Svensson
12 Mats Åhlberg
15 Dan Söderström
16 Niklas Eriksson
22 Nisse Nilsson

Honored coaches 
Rune Mases

Hockey Hall of Famers
 Ed Belfour – Class of 2011

References

External links 

Leksands IF – Official site

Swedish Hockey League teams
Ice hockey teams in Sweden
Ice hockey teams in Dalarna County
1919 establishments in Sweden
Ice hockey clubs established in 1919
Bandy clubs established in 1919
Association football clubs established in 1919